Local Partnerships LLP is joint venture owned by HM Treasury, the Local Government Association and Welsh Government established 2009. It serves as a Public-private partnership unit in England and Wales.

It is funded by fee income from chargeable services and money 'top-sliced' from local authorities' Revenue Support Grant (RSG) payments from the UK government, grant funding from UK government departments such as Defra and MHCLG.

Local Partnerships and the Greater London Authority are responsible for the operation of the Re:fit 4 programme which is a procurement initiative for public bodies wishing to implement energy efficiency measures and local energy generation projects on their assets. The Re:Fit framework will be operational until April 2024.

Local Partnerships has a team of PFI specialists who provide support to contracts across the full range of financial, technical and legal specialisms, particularly as the contracts come to an end or may benefit from refinancing.

The current Chair is Keith Fraser and Chief Executive, Adele Gritten.

References

Local government in the United Kingdom
HM Treasury
Public–private partnership units